Interco may refer to:

 International Code of Signals
 Interco (furniture company) later Furniture Brands International, an American home furnishings company based in Clayton, Missouri
 Interco (horse), an American Thoroughbred racehorse, winner of the 1984 San Fernando Stakes
 Interco Tire Corporation: Louisiana based tire company.